Viktor Tišler (30 November 1941 – 19 September 2013) was a Slovenian ice hockey player. He competed in the men's tournaments at the 1964 Winter Olympics, the 1968 Winter Olympics and the 1972 Winter Olympics.

References

1941 births
2013 deaths
Slovenian ice hockey forwards
Olympic ice hockey players of Yugoslavia
Ice hockey players at the 1964 Winter Olympics
Ice hockey players at the 1968 Winter Olympics
Ice hockey players at the 1972 Winter Olympics
Sportspeople from Jesenice, Jesenice
Slovenian ice hockey defencemen
Yugoslav ice hockey defencemen
Yugoslav ice hockey forwards
HDD Olimpija Ljubljana players
HK Acroni Jesenice players
Springfield Kings players
Yugoslav expatriate ice hockey people
Yugoslav expatriate sportspeople in West Germany
Yugoslav expatriate sportspeople in the United States
Expatriate ice hockey players in the United States
Expatriate ice hockey players in West Germany
Frankfurt Lions players